Tripp Ice Tongue is an ice tongue that occupies the north half of Tripp Bay on the coast of Victoria Land. The feature is nurtured by several glaciers (Fry Glacier, Hedblom Glacier, as well as ice from Oates Piedmont Glacier). It could be misleading to name this tongue in association with one of these partial sources. It is therefore named for its geographic location in Tripp Bay.

Glaciers of Victoria Land
Scott Coast